Isenhagen Abbey is a convent in Hankensbüttel in the district of Gifhorn in the German state of Lower Saxony. It was a nunnery founded by the Cistercian order but is now a Lutheran women's convent. It is managed by the monastic chamber in Hanover.

Origins 
The name of the abbey, Isenhagen, is probably derived from its original site next to the River Ise and an area of woodland. It was founded in 1243 as a friary for Cistercians in the present-day locality of Alt-Isenhagen within the town of Hankensbüttel. After being in existence for just 16 years it was burnt down and, in 1262, rebuilt as a nunnery. In 1329 it was moved to Hankensbüttel where it is to this day.

Description 
Since the Reformation the site has been a convent for Lutheran conventuals. In its Brick Gothic buildings it houses a rich treasure of medieval furniture and high quality works of art: carved and painted altars, sculptures, small paintings for private devotions and embroidered altar cloths and antependia, some of which are adorned with golden reliefs and pearls.

Literature 
 Horst Appuhn: Bilder aus Kloster Isenhagen, Königstein i. Ts. 1989 (= Die Blauen Bücher),

External links 
Website for Isenhagen Abbey

Monasteries in Lower Saxony
Lüneburg Heath
Cistercian monasteries in Germany
Lutheran women's convents
Buildings and structures in Gifhorn (district)